Frank Moher (born 1955) is a Canadian playwright, director, and journalist.

He was born in Edmonton, Alberta and lived in New York City and Calgary, Alberta. His plays include Odd Jobs (1985) which has been produced internationally  and was a finalist for the Governor General's Award, The Third Ascent which toured Canada and won the Edmonton Sterling Award for Outstanding New Play, Supreme Dream (with Rhonda Trodd, 1995) which also toured Canada, and Big Baby (2004). His plays are published by the Playwrights Guild of Canada, Playwrights Canada Press, and online by ProPlay.

Moher has been the Artistic Producer of Western Edge Theatre in Nanaimo, British Columbia since 2002, and is editor and media critic for the online magazine backofthebook.ca.

External links 
 Frank Moher in The Canadian Theatre Encyclopedia
 Frank Moher in Canadian Who's Who
 frankmoher.com

20th-century Canadian dramatists and playwrights
21st-century Canadian dramatists and playwrights
Living people
1955 births
Canadian male dramatists and playwrights
Writers from Edmonton
20th-century Canadian male writers
21st-century Canadian male writers